Aleksandr Osipov may refer to:

 Aleksandr Osipov (footballer) (born 1998), Russian football player
 Aleksandr Osipov (ice hockey) (born 1989), Russian ice hockey player
 Aleksandr Osipov (politician) (born 1969), Russian politician

See also
Aleksandr Osipovich (born 1977), Belarusian former professional footballer